Arena 2000 is an arena, in Yaroslavl, Russia. It opened in 2001 and holds approximately 9,000 people. It is primarily used for ice hockey and is the home arena for Lokomotiv Yaroslavl team. It is also used for concerts, exhibitions and as a skating rink. It hosted the 2003 IIHF World U18 Championships.

External links
Official website of Arena 2000
Pictures of arena

Indoor arenas in Russia
Indoor ice hockey venues in Russia
Sport in Yaroslavl
Lokomotiv Yaroslavl
Buildings and structures in Yaroslavl Oblast
Kontinental Hockey League venues